Thomas Jacob Black (born August 28, 1969) is an American actor, comedian, and musician. He is known for his acting roles in the films High Fidelity (2000), Shallow Hal (2001), Orange County (2002), School of Rock (2003), Envy (2004), King Kong (2005), The Holiday (2006), Gulliver's Travels (2010), Bernie (2011), The House with a Clock in Its Walls (2018), and the Jumanji franchise; in addition, as of August 2022, his music video for "Tribute"—as one half of the Grammy Award–winning comedy rock duo Tenacious D—has accumulated more than 112 million views on YouTube alone. Additionally, he is also well known for his voice-acting roles as the giant panda named Po from DreamWorks Animation's Kung Fu Panda films. Black gained Golden Globe nominations for his work in School of Rock and Bernie, and was given a star on Hollywood's Walk of Fame in 2018.

He is the lead vocalist of the Tenacious D, and formed the duo in 1994 with long-time friend Kyle Gass. They have released four studio albums together—their self-titled debut Tenacious D, The Pick of Destiny, Rize of the Fenix, and Post-Apocalypto—in addition to starring in the television series Tenacious D (1997–2000) and film Tenacious D in The Pick of Destiny (2006). Since 2018, Black has maintained a YouTube channel called Jablinski Games.

Early life 
Thomas Jacob Black was born in Santa Monica, California, on August 28, 1969, the son of satellite engineers Thomas William Black and Judith Love Cohen. He was raised in Hermosa Beach, California. His mother worked on the Minuteman nuclear missile guidance system, the Apollo lunar module guidance system, the science ground station for the Hubble Space Telescope, and was also a writer.

He has three older half-siblings through his mother: scientist Neil Siegel, Howard Siegel, and Rachel Siegel. His mother was born Jewish, and his father converted to Judaism. Black was raised Jewish, attending Hebrew school and having a bar mitzvah. His ancestry also includes English, German, Irish, Northern Irish, Polish, Russian, and Scottish.

Black's parents divorced when he was 10, and his father then stopped practicing Judaism. Black moved to Culver City with his father and frequently visited his mother's home. As a child, he appeared in a commercial for the Activision game Pitfall! in 1982. For high school, Black's parents enrolled him at the Poseidon School, a private secondary school designed for students struggling in the traditional school system. He also attended the Crossroads School, where he excelled in drama. He later attended University of California, Los Angeles (UCLA), but dropped out during his sophomore year to pursue a career in entertainment. Fellow UCLA student Tim Robbins later cast Black in Bob Roberts. In 1995 and 1996, he gained recurring roles in the HBO sketch comedy series Mr. Show.

Career

Acting career

Early roles 

In 1982, Black's first acting job was in a television commercial at age 13 for the video game Pitfall!. In 1987, Black joined the Actors' Gang, a theater troupe founded by UCLA students including Tim Robbins, and appeared in a variety of stage productions. Black's adult career began with small roles on prime time television, including Life Goes On, Northern Exposure, Mr. Show, Picket Fences, The Golden Palace, and The X-Files. Black appeared in the unaired TV pilot Heat Vision and Jack, directed by Ben Stiller, in which he played an ex-astronaut pursued by actor Ron Silver. He was accompanied by his friend who had merged with a motorcycle, voiced by Owen Wilson.

After Robbins cast him in Bob Roberts, Black began appearing in small film roles such as Airborne (1993), Demolition Man, Waterworld, The Fan, The Cable Guy, Mars Attacks!, Dead Man Walking, The Jackal, Crossworlds, Enemy of the State, and others. He had a small role in True Romance as a security guard, but the scene was deleted.

Leading roles 

In 2000, Black co-starred in the film High Fidelity as a wild employee in a record store run by John Cusack. Black considers his role in High Fidelity as his breakout into the Hollywood scene. He quickly gained leading roles in films such as Shallow Hal, Nacho Libre, Tenacious D in The Pick of Destiny, Year One, and Gulliver's Travels. He received particular praise for his starring role in the well-received School of Rock, earning critical acclaim and a Golden Globe nomination for Best Actor – Musical or Comedy.

He starred in one of his few dramatic roles as the obsessed filmmaker Carl Denham in Peter Jackson's 2005 remake of King Kong, a performance he based on Orson Welles. He voiced the title role in Kung Fu Panda, which grossed  on its opening day, June 6, 2008, as well as Kung Fu Panda 2 and Kung Fu Panda 3; this is his favorite role, and he praises the tutoring of co-star and two-time Academy Award winner Dustin Hoffman. His next film, The Big Year, a competitive birdwatching comedy co-starring Owen Wilson, Steve Martin, and JoBeth Williams, was released in October 2011.

Black garnered a second Golden Globe Award nomination, this time in the category Best Actor in a Comedy, for his 2011 starring role in Richard Linklater's black comedy Bernie. He played as real-life murderer Bernie Tiede, a funeral director in a small East Texas town, who befriends and eventually murders a rich widow, played by Shirley MacLaine. Black's subdued portrayal, authentic East Texas accent, and musical talent – he sings several gospel hymns as well as "Seventy-six Trombones" – had Roger Ebert describing Black's work as "one of the performances of the year."

In December 2022, it was alleged that a sequel to The Holiday was in pre-production. It was alleged that Black, Cameron Diaz, Jude Law and Kate Winslet have all signed on to reprise their roles from the original. However, director Meyers and Winslet both denied the rumor.

Later television roles 

In 2004, Black guest-starred in the first episode of Cartoon Network's Adult Swim show Tom Goes to the Mayor. He appeared in the post-Super Bowl episode of The Office along with Cloris Leachman and Jessica Alba in a fake movie within the show. In 2010, Black made a guest appearance on Community and also guest-starred on Nickelodeon's iCarly in an episode titled, "iStart a Fan War".

Black has appeared numerous times on the "untelevised TV network" short film festival Channel 101, created by Dan Harmon and Rob Schrab, starring in the shows Computerman, Timebelt, and Laserfart. He also provided an introduction for the unaired sketch comedy Awesometown, donning a Colonial-era military uniform. In the introduction, he claims to be George Washington and takes credit for the accomplishments of other American Presidents such as Thomas Jefferson and Abraham Lincoln.

Hosting work and appearances 

On December 14, he hosted the 2008 Spike Video Game Awards. Black has hosted the Nickelodeon Kids' Choice Awards and Acceptable.TV. He presented the tribute to rock legends Led Zeppelin when the band was named as 2012 recipients of Kennedy Center Honors. In 2016, Black joined the climate change documentary show Years of Living Dangerously as one of its celebrity correspondents. In 2018, Black appeared in the music video for Gorillaz song "Humility".

Voice acting 

In addition to Kung Fu Panda, Black has voice acted on other occasions, including "Husbands and Knives" from The Simpsons, which aired November 18, 2007, portraying Milo, the friendly owner of the rival comic book store. He provided the voice of the main character, roadie Eddie Riggs, in the heavy metal–themed action-adventure video game Brütal Legend. In 2009, at the Spike Video Game Awards, he earned the Best Voice award for the voice of Eddie Riggs in Brütal Legend. In April 2009, Black starred in an episode of Yo Gabba Gabba!, in which he vocalized children songs, such as "It's Not Fun to Get Lost", "Friends", and "The Goodbye Song". He has also had starring voice-overs in animated features, including Zeke in Ice Age (2002) and Lenny in Shark Tale (2004).

Black voiced Darth Vader in Bad Lip Reading's parodies of the Star Wars original trilogy on YouTube. In 2015, Black played a fictional version of real-life author R. L. Stine for Goosebumps, and provided the voices of two of Stine's creations, Slappy the Dummy and The Invisible Boy. He reprised the Stine role in the film's 2018 sequel, Goosebumps 2: Haunted Halloween. He also voiced himself and many other additional characters on the animated YouTube series "Tenacious D in Post-Apocalypto", which he also co-directed and co-wrote, along with his Tenacious D partner Kyle Gass. Black will be providing the voice of Bowser in The Super Mario Bros. Movie, scheduled to release in April 2023.

Musical career 

Black is the lead singer and guitarist for the comedy rock/hard rock band Tenacious D along with Kyle Gass. They have released four albums, a self-titled debut, The Pick of Destiny, Rize of the Fenix, and Post-Apocalypto. One of their songs from their album The Pick of Destiny, titled "The Metal", was used in the music video games Guitar Hero III: Legends of Rock and Brütal Legend. "Rock Your Socks", from the album Tenacious D, was played in the music video game Rock Band Unplugged as well. "Master Exploder" from The Pick Of Destiny went on to be used in music video games Guitar Hero Van Halen, Rock Band 2, and Brütal Legend, along with their song "Tribute" from Tenacious D. "Master Exploder" and "The Metal" featured in the comedy film Tenacious D in The Pick of Destiny. The film, directed by Tenacious D veteran Liam Lynch, featured recurring characters from Black's comedy such as Lee the super-fan and the Sasquatch. Several celebrities had roles in the film; actor Tim Robbins cameos as does Dave Grohl as Satan. Ben Stiller also makes an appearance as a worker at a Guitar Center, even having a role in the music video for "Tribute".

Tenacious D helped the United Mitochondrial Disease Foundation raise awareness of these diseases and funds for the organization in Los Angeles on December 20, 2001, and in San Diego, California on June 16, 2007. Tenacious D can be seen performing in the 90s-era Pauly Shore film Bio-Dome where the duo is performing its song "The Five Needs" at a "Save the Environment" party. Black was also a guest star on an episode of The Ellen DeGeneres Show entitled "Ellen the Musical", alongside Broadway star Kristin Chenoweth and teenage singer-actress Olivia Olson. On the show, besides singing, he discussed his then-upcoming film Nacho Libre with the host.

In 2000, Jack Black (along with Kyle Gass) provided backing vocals to punk rock band The Vandals' song "Fourteen", which appears on their album Look What I Almost Stepped In.... Black has also appeared on Dave Grohl's Probot album, providing vocals for the hidden song "I Am The Warlock", and Lynch's Fake Songs album, providing vocals for the song "Rock and Roll Whore". Black performed a cover of Marvin Gaye's "Let's Get It On" in the last sequence of High Fidelity. He lent his musical abilities to the Queens of the Stone Age song "Burn the Witch" with rhythmic stomps and claps. He also provided vocals for two tracks on the 2006 album Death by Sexy by Eagles of Death Metal, and on The Lonely Island's track "Sax Man" from the album Incredibad.

Black also recorded a duet on Meat Loaf's album, Hang Cool Teddy Bear, on the song "Like a Rose". Meat Loaf also played Black's father in the Pick of Destiny movie.

Black has appeared in music videos of Beck's "Sexx Laws"; Foo Fighters' "Learn To Fly", "Low", and "The One"; The Eagles of Death Metal's "I Want You So Hard (Boy's Bad News)"; Sum 41's "Things I Want"; Dio's "Push"; Weezer's "Photograph"; The Mooney Suzuki's "In a Young Man's Mind"; "Weird Al" Yankovic's "Tacky", and Die Antwoord's "Ugly Boy". In October 2010, Tenacious D appeared at BlizzCon 2010, a convention hosted by the game designers, Blizzard Entertainment. In 2012, Jack Black joined up with other celebrities to record "Book People Unite", a song sponsored by the Library of Congress and RIF.

Black did guest vocals and appeared on the Dethklok soundtrack album The Doomstar Requiem. He sings the parts for Dethklok's original band manager as well as a blogger.

Black, as a member of Tenacious D, won the award for Best Metal Performance at the 57th Grammy Awards. The song "The Last in Line" won the award, a cover of the song of the same name by Dio that appeared on the tribute album This Is Your Life.

YouTube channel 

On December 21, 2018, Black created a YouTube channel called Jablinski Games. Within one week of its launch, it had amassed over 1 million subscribers. The videos published on the channel are typically either candid vlogs involving Black and his two sons, or gaming content. Jack created the channel largely in order to bond with his son, who serves as videographer and editor of the channel. On July 21, 2019, Black took part in a Minecraft stream with popular YouTuber PewDiePie in order to raise money for the National Alliance on Mental Illness (NAMI), in the wake of the suicide of Etika in June 2019. After two days of streaming, they raised $30,479 with the stream being broadcast live both on YouTube and on the streaming platform DLive. As of August 2022, Jablinski Games has 4.86 million subscribers and 195 million video views.

Awards and nominations 

Black was nominated for two Golden Globes. On September 18, 2018, Black was inducted into Hollywood's Walk of Fame.

Electric Dynamite Productions, Inc. 

In August 2006, Black registered his own production company, Electric Dynamite Productions, Inc. The company's first work produced was the 2009 mockumentary Branson, which was a co-production with BranMo Productions and Perfect Weekend. In 2011, the company would produce two TV-movies, My Life As an Experiment and Shredd. In 2013, the company notably produced TV series Ghost Ghirls for the now-defunct Yahoo! Screen, as well as obtained the rights to adapt the UK mockumentary Wizard's Way into a feature film. The company would also be a producer credit on The D Train (2015) and The Polka King (2017), both of which featured Black in the starring role. The company produced The Aquabats! RadVentures! in 2018, the dark-comedy film Happily in 2021.

Filmography

Personal life 

At age 14, Black struggled with cocaine use. He said, "I was having a lot of troubles with cocaine... I was hanging out with some pretty rough characters. I was scared to go to school because one of them wanted to kill me. I wanted to get out of there."

One of Black's brothers, Howard, died of AIDS in 1991 at age 36. His oldest brother, Neil, is an engineer, scientist, and musician.

Black dated actress Laura Kightlinger between 1996 and 2005.

In January 2006, Black became engaged to singer Tanya Haden, a daughter of jazz bassist Charlie Haden. They had both attended Crossroads School, and 15 years after graduating they met again at a friend's birthday party. They married on March 14, 2006 in Big Sur, California. Their sons were born in 2006 and 2008.

Although an atheist, Black identifies as nominally Jewish, and fatherhood influenced his decision to raise his children in the Jewish faith.

Black endorsed Barack Obama's 2012 re-election campaign. In 2015, he visited Kampala as part of Comic Relief USA's Red Nose Day.

Black was an outspoken critic of Donald Trump. On the day of Trump's presidential inauguration, he and Tenacious D bandmate Kyle Gass performed their 2006 protest song "The Government Totally Sucks". Black said to the audience beforehand, "We haven't played [this song] for years, because it just never felt appropriate—but now, we're happy to unleash the beast. The government totally sucks."

References

External links 

 
 
 
 
 

20th-century American guitarists
20th-century American male actors
21st-century American comedians
21st-century American male actors
1969 births
Jewish American atheists
American comedy musicians
American male child actors
American male comedians
American male film actors
American male guitarists
American male singer-songwriters
American male television actors
American male voice actors
American rock singers
American rock songwriters
American sketch comedians
American television writers
American YouTubers
Crossroads School alumni
Grammy Award winners
Guitarists from California
Jewish American comedians
Jewish American male actors
Jewish American musicians
Jewish singers
Living people
Male actors from Santa Monica, California
American male television writers
Musicians from Santa Monica, California
Rhythm guitarists
Screenwriters from California
Tenacious D members
UCLA Film School alumni
Writers from Santa Monica, California
YouTube channels launched in 2018
American tenors
Singer-songwriters from California
21st-century American Jews
Frat Pack